Grant Township is a township in Douglas County, Kansas, USA.  As of the 2000 census, its population was 442.

History
Grant Township was annexed  from the extreme southern portion of Sarcoxie Township in Jefferson County in 1872. The largest town was called Jefferson until it was renamed North Lawrence in 1870.

Geography
According to the USGS, it contains one cemetery, Maple Grove.

Adjacent Townships
Rural Township, Jefferson County (northwest)
Sarcoxie Township, Jefferson County (north)
Reno Township, Leavenworth County (east)
Wakarusa Township, Douglas County (south)

Towns and Settlements
Although these towns may not be incorporated or populated, they are still placed on maps produced by the county.

Midland, located at 
North Lawrence, located at

Transportation

Major highways
I-70, part of the Kansas Turnpike
U.S. Highway 24
U.S. Highway 40
U.S. Highway 59
K-32

Places of interest

Located near Lyon Street and North 9th Street, just outside North Lawrence was the community of Bismarck Grove which held fairs and chautauquas between 1878 and 1900.
Riverfront Park is a park maintained by the Army Corps of Engineers that follows the Kansas River levee from Leavenworth County to Jefferson County
The Union Pacific Railroad Depot was designed by Henry Van Brunt and built in 1889. It was used until 1984, was saved from demolition and is now the Lawrence Visitors Information Center.

References

External links
 US-Counties.com
 City-Data.com

Townships in Douglas County, Kansas
Townships in Kansas